Gorna Verenitsa is a village in Montana Municipality, Montana Province, western Bulgaria. It has a population of approximately 186 people.

References

Villages in Montana Province